The Alfa Romeo Disco Volante by Touring is a two-seater coupé, built by Carrozzeria Touring in 2013. It is based on the Alfa Romeo 8C Competizione.

The model name is derived from the Disco Volante of the 1950s. The Disco Volante is rear-wheel-drive with a six-speed automated manual gearbox. The transmission is a transaxle with limited-slip differential, while the suspension is independent quadrilateral and made of aluminium.

Spyder 

A Spyder version of Disco Volante was presented at the Geneva Motor Show in March 2016.  A limited series of only seven cars will be manufactured. This is based on Alfa Romeo 8C Spider chassis.

References

Disco Volante by Touring
Cars introduced in 2013
Rear-wheel-drive vehicles
Sports cars
Coupés